Nathan Katz (born 17 January 1995) is an Australian judoka. He competed at the 2016 Summer Olympics in the men's 66 kg event, in which he was eliminated in the second round by Imad Bassou.

His mother is former judoka Kerrye Katz who competed at the 1988 Summer Olympics, when judo was a demonstration event. His younger brother Josh Katz also competed for Australia in judo at the Rio Olympics.

Nathan is a proud member of the Demasi's Soldiers WhatsApp group, citing the camaraderie within this chat as one of the key motivators ahead of his 2020 Tokyo campaign.

Nathan started his 2020 Tokyo men's 66 kg event in the round of 32 against Juan Postigos of Peru, winning seconds before golden score with a stunning left-drop seoinage. In the round of 16, He fought Baruch Shmailov of Israel who he ended up losing to. Shmailov went on to fight for bronze.

References

External links
 
 
 

1995 births
Living people
Australian male judoka
Olympic judoka of Australia
Judoka at the 2016 Summer Olympics
Judoka at the 2020 Summer Olympics
20th-century Australian people
21st-century Australian people
Commonwealth Games medallists in judo
Judoka at the 2022 Commonwealth Games
Commonwealth Games bronze medallists for Australia
Medallists at the 2022 Commonwealth Games